Bangabandhu Science and Technology Fellowship Trust is a Bangladesh government supported and funded scholarship program for science and technology education and research.

History
Bangabandhu Science and Technology Fellowship Trust was formed through the passage of Bangabandhu Science & Technology Trust Bill-2016 in Parliament of Bangladesh on 16 February 2016. The trust will be managed by a trustee board and will be headed by the Minister or State Minister. The Bangabandhu Science & Technology Trust Bill-2016 was introduced by Yafes Osman, the Minister of Science and Technology.
Bangabandhu Science and Technology Fellowship Trust awarded 1554.5 million Bangladeshi taka ($18.3M as of 2020) worth of scholarships to 519 scholars from 2010 to 2020.

References

2016 establishments in Bangladesh
Organisations based in Dhaka
Government agencies of Bangladesh
Research institutes in Bangladesh
Science and technology in Bangladesh
Scholarships in Bangladesh